The following articles list named standardized models of jeepneys, a common mode of transportation used in the Philippines.

Most traditional jeepneys have no standard construction hence will not be part of this list. There are also common practice in jeepney construction depending on the region. Also it is common practice to use an existing vehicle model by larger automobile manufacturers as a base in jeepney assembly. In Iloilo the  manufacturers use the Honda Civic or Toyota Corolla as base. In Bacolod, jeepneys often have a makeup to that of Asian Utility Vehicle (AUV).

For the purpose of this list, only models which could be traced to a manufacturer is included. The list includes vehicles that are often considered as "jeepneys" by the media, authoritative sources, and the manufacturers themselves, which may be considered by some to be mini-buses due to their make-up deviating from the traditional jeepney design.

List

References

Modern jeepneys, list of
Lists of vehicles
Public transportation in the Philippines